The Paran Brigade is an Israeli regular infantry regional brigade that is subordinated to the 80th Division and traditionally associated with the Southern Command. The Paran Brigade was established through a reconfiguration of the Sagi Brigade.

The brigade headquarters are at Ketziot.

Structure 
The Paran Brigade incorporates and consolidates in a single formation the mixed (male and female) Caracal, the Lions of Jordan, the Cheetah, and Bardalas battalions, already serving within the 80th Division.

The Paran Brigade is unique in relation to the rest of the IDF divisions as a regional and regular brigade.

Mission 

The mission of the Paran Brigade is twofold: border surveillance and defence, and internal training of the troops assigned. The protection of the Israeli-Egyptian border is from Eliat to Holot Halutza with Egypt’s Sinai, and, according to Andrea Spada, particularly the area extending from Nitsana.

Distinctive insignia 
The soldiers in the brigade will have the speckled, yellow, green and brown berets of the Border Defense Force and wear red boots and a newly designed tag on their shoulder.

References

Brigades of Israel
Military units and formations established in 2018